Tarazak may refer to:
 Tarazak-e Abdollah
 Tarazak-e Kasan